The Talaud rail (Gymnocrex talaudensis) is a species of bird in the family Rallidae.
It is endemic to the Talaud Islands of Indonesia. Its natural habitats are rivers and swamps. It is threatened by habitat loss.

References

External links
BirdLife Species Factsheet.
Image at ADW

Endemic birds of Sulawesi
Gymnocrex
Birds described in 1998
Taxa named by Frank R. Lambert
Taxonomy articles created by Polbot